A.S. Kigali Football Club is a Rwandan football club from Kigali. They play their home games at Kigali Stadium located in Nyamirambo. Established in 1999, the team plays in the Rwandan Premier League. AS Kigali has won the Rwandan Cup two times and the Rwandan Super Cup two times.

Achievements
 Rwandan Cup: 3
 2013, 2019, 2022
Rwandan Super Cup: 2
 2013, 2019
Rwanda Women's Football League: 6
2009, 2010, 2011, 2012, 2013, 2014

References

External links
Team profile at Soccerway

Kigali
Sport in Kigali